The Waterford Crystal Cup was an annual hurling competition organised by the Munster Council of the Gaelic Athletic Association from 2006 to 2015 for the top inter-county teams and third-level institutes and universities in the province of Munster in Ireland.

The series of games were played during January and February. The prize for the winning team is a special piece of glassware donated by Waterford Crystal. This cup competition was always been played on a straight knockout basis whereby once a team loses they are eliminated from the series of games.

The Waterford Crystal Cup was effectively a pre-season tournament.  It allowed teams to blood new players and to experiment prior to the opening of the National Hurling League (for county teams) or Fitzgibbon Cup (for third-level teams).

History
The Waterford Crystal Cup was played for the first time in 2006. It replaced the informal Waterford Crystal South-East Hurling League which had been running since 1996 and was the brainchild of the Waterford County Board.

In 2016 it was replaced by the Munster Senior Hurling League, which only admits county teams.

Format
The Waterford Crystal Cup is a knockout tournament with pairings drawn at random - there are no seeds.

Each match is played as a single leg. If a match is drawn a period of extra-time is played, however, if both sides are still level at the end a second replay takes place and so on until a winner is found.

Roll of honour

List of finals

References

External links
 Waterford Crystal Cup results

 
Hurling cup competitions in Munster
Munster GAA inter-county hurling competitions
Defunct hurling competitions